"Watermelon in Easter Hay", full name "Playing a Guitar Solo With This Band is Like Trying To Grow a Watermelon in Easter Hay", by Frank Zappa, is the penultimate song on the 1979 concept album Joe's Garage. The main character from this three-part rock opera is faced with the banning of all music after being repeatedly raped in prison, and copes after his release by imagining guitar solos in his head for the entire third act of the album. As he "begins to feel depressed now, he knows the end is near", this song acts as the character's final goodbye to music as he moves on with his life, detailed in "A Little Green Rosetta", the next and final song of the album.

The song is introduced by opening narration by Zappa as the Central Scrutinizer, which then gives way to a guitar solo. This guitar solo is the only guitar solo specifically recorded for the album, as every other guitar solo was xenochronous—overdubbed from older live recordings. The entire song consists of two alternating harmonies: A and B / E (This could also be thought of as an E major 7th sus 2), linked by a G#. This simplicity is made more interesting by the emphasis in the solo on the note D#, a tritone above the bass A, which conveys the harmony A#11. The 9/4 time signature keeps the two-chord harmonic structure sounding fresh.

Reception and legacy
In their review of the album, Down Beat magazine criticized the song, but subsequent reviewers have championed the song as Zappa's masterpiece.  Lowe called it the "crowning achievement of the album" and "one of the most gorgeous pieces of music ever produced".  Zappa told Neil Slaven that he thought it was "the best song on the album". The song's title is thought to have come from a saying used by Zappa while recording the album: "Playing a guitar solo with this band is like trying to grow a watermelon in Easter hay". After Zappa died, "Watermelon in Easter Hay" became known as one of his signature songs, and his son Dweezil Zappa later referred to it as "the best solo Zappa ever played".

Personnel 
 Frank Zappa – lead guitar
 Warren Cuccurullo – rhythm guitar
 Denny Walley – slide guitar
 Peter Wolf – keyboards
 Tommy Mars – keyboards
 Arthur Barrow – bass
 Ed Mann – percussion
 Vinnie Colaiuta – drums

In popular culture

Film 
 "Watermelon in Easter Hay" was the ending credit song in Alfonso Cuarón's 2001 drama Y Tu Mamá También.
 "Watermelon in Easter Hay" was used in Deathwish Skateboards full length video "UNCROSSED" as the featured track during skateboarder Jamie Foy's skate part in the film.

References 

1979 songs
Frank Zappa songs
Songs about music
Songs about depression
Song recordings produced by Frank Zappa
Songs written by Frank Zappa